Renauldia is a genus of mosses in the family Pterobryaceae.

Species include:
Renauldia africana	
Renauldia baueri Thér.	
Renauldia chilensis Thér.	
Renauldia cochlearifolia Broth.	
Renauldia dusenii (Broth.) Broth.
Renauldia hildebrandtielloides Müll. Hal.	
Renauldia hoehnelii (Müll. Hal.) Broth.	
Renauldia lycopodioides Bizot ex Pócs	
Renauldia mexicana (Mitt.) H.A. Crum	
Renauldia paradoxica B.H. Allen
Renauldia patentissima (Hampe) Broth.
Renauldia peruviana (Mitt.) Broth.

References

Hypnales
Taxonomy articles created by Polbot
Moss genera